The Crown Prince of Greece is the heir apparent or presumptive to the defunct throne of Greece. Since the abolition of the Greek monarchy by the then-ruling military regime on 1 June 1973, it is merely considered a courtesy title.

Title 
Neither the constitution of 1844 or 1864, which served as the basis for other fundamental laws of the Kingdom of Greece, recognised titles of nobility. On the contrary, they prohibited even the sovereign from conferring such titles.

As a result, the heir apparent was usually referred to simply as "the diadochos" by virtue of his function, rather than as a title. The word diadochos (διάδοχος) simply means "successor, he who collects the estate". This is a deverbal of διαδέχομαι (diadéchomai), "receive by succession", and has been used since the Archaic period for heirs-apparent. The most famous bearers of the title were the Diadochi, the "Successors" of Alexander the Great, who contended with each other for the spoils of his empire.

Only one crown prince, the future Constantine I, bore a separate title of nobility, that of "Duke of Sparta", created soon after his birth in 1868. However, as it ran contrary to the constitution, it caused a political scandal; although in the end ratified by the Greek parliament, the title's use within Greece was very restricted.

Succession 
The London Conference of 1832, established a semi-salic line of succession which would pass the crown to Otto I's descendants, or his younger brothers, should he have no issue. It was also decided that in no case would the crowns of Greece and Bavaria be joined in a personal union.

The continued inability of Otto and Queen Amalia to have children was a permanent threat to the stability of Otto's throne: the 1844 constitution insisted that Otto's successor had to be Orthodox, but as the king was childless, the only possible heirs were his younger brothers, Luitpold and Adalbert. The staunch Catholicism of the Wittelsbachs complicated matters, as Luitpold refused to convert and Adalbert married Infanta Amalia of Spain. The sons of Adalbert, and especially the eldest, Ludwig Ferdinand, were now considered the most likely candidates, but due to the issue of religion, no definite arrangements were ever made prior to Otto's deposition in 1862.

Since the establishment of the constitution of 1952, the daughters of the sovereign came after their brothers in the order of succession to the throne.

When Constantine II succeeded Paul I in 1964, his sister became heir presumptive according to the 1952 Constitution but that caused a constitutional crisis because his father's cousin Prince Peter who declared himself heir to the throne on the pretext that female dynasts had been unlawfully granted succession rights, but Prince Peter lost his succession rights by marrying Irina Ovtchinnikova in 1939. Also at the time Constantine's older sister Princess Sophia married the future Juan Carlos I in 1962 and cousin Prince Philip married Queen Elizabeth II in 1947 renounced their rights for their descendants.

Personal standard

Crown princes of the House of Glücksburg

References

Notes

Bibliography
 

Greek monarchy
Greece